Sergiy is a Ukrainian masculine given name that comes from the ancient Roman generic name Sergius. The current official transliteration from Ukrainian is Serhii (previously the following variants were also used: Sergiy, Serhiy, Sergii, Serhij). Russian variant of this name is Sergey. Spanish variant of this name is Sergio.

Ukrainian-born people
 Sergiy Bezugliy (born 1984), sprint canoer
 Sergiy Biloushchenko (born 1981), rower 
 Sergiy Breus (born 1983), butterfly swimmer
 Sergiy Bychkov (born 1961), politician, civil engineer, and lawyer
 Sergiy Demchuk (born 19??), paralympic swimmer
 Sergiy Dzindziruk (born 1976), professional boxer
 Sergiy Gladyr (born 1988), professional basketball player
 Sergiy Gorbenko (born 1985), professional basketball player 
 Sergiy Grechyn (born 1979), professional road cyclist
 Sergiy Ivliev (born 1984), footballer
 Sergiy Kirichenko (born 1952), army general 
 Sergiy Klimniuk (born 1976), sprint canoer
 Sergiy Kolos (born 19??), paralympic athlete
 Sergiy Korsunsky (born 1962), diplomat
 Sergiy Kulyk (born 1958), diplomat
 Sergiy Kyslytsya (born 1969), former Ukrainian diplomat and politician
 Sergiy Lagkuti (born 1985), racing cyclist
 Sergiy Matveyev (born 1975), former professional road bicycle racer
 Sergiy Osovych (born 1973), sprinter
 Sergiy Semyon (born 1990), footballer
 Sergiy Sergeyev (swimmer) (born 1970), swimmer
 Sergiy Sergeyev (footballer) (born 1982), footballer
 Sergiy Shevchenko (1908–200?), politician and diplomat
 Sergiy Stakhovsky (born 1986), professional tennis player
 Sergiy Tretyak (born 1984), footballer
 Sergiy Verigin (1868–1938 a Russian Orthodox clergyman, converted to Catholicism.
 Sergiy Vilkomir (1956–2020), computer scientist

Ukrainian masculine given names
Lists of people by given name